A Private Affair is a 2002 French crime mystery thriller film written and directed by Guillaume Nicloux. The film premiered at the Festival du Film Policier de Cognac on 13 April 2002 and was released theatrically in France on 30 April 2002.

Plot
François Manéri is a private detective in charge of the whereabouts of a young missing woman, Rachel Siprien. Six months have passed since the disappearance. At the request of the mother of the latter, François took over the business. The multifaceted personality of the young woman draws a complex web between her best friend, Clarisse, her ex-boyfriend, her stepfather, neighbors and those who knew her from near and far.

Cast
 Thierry Lhermitte as François Manéri
 Marion Cotillard as Clarisse Entoven
 Samuel Le Bihan as Vincent Walt
 Aurore Clément as Madame Siprien
 Niels Arestrup as Monsieur Siprien
 Jeanne Balibar as Sylvie
 Clovis Cornillac as Freddy
 Philippe Nahon as Mathieu
 Bruno Todeschini as Franck Tanner
 Philippe Morier-Genoud as Henri Dalvec
 Louis-Do de Lencquesaing as Philippe
 Yves Verhoeven as Monsieur Pujol
 Carlo Brandt as Inspector Rossen
 Gérald Thomassin as Inspector Bonnis
 Garance Clavel as Sandrine Pujol
 Consuelo De Haviland as Claudine Després
 Lydia Andrei as Marion
 Marie-Armelle Deguy as Nadège
 Françoise Sage as Martine
 Laurent Grévill as Josselin
 Marc Rioufol as Gilles
 Mathieu Genet as Frédéric
 Sacha Dougnac as Paul
 Frédéric Diefenthal as the transvestite
 Robert Hirsch as the old man
 Jean-Pierre Darroussin as Apolus man

References

External links
 
 
 

2002 films
2002 crime thriller films
2000s French-language films
2000s mystery thriller films
Films about missing people
Films set in Paris
Films shot in Paris
French crime thriller films
French detective films
French mystery thriller films
2000s French films